East Noble High School is a public high school located in Kendallville, Indiana and is the only high school that is part of the East Noble School Corporation. It serves to educate more than 1,000 students from the cities and towns of Rome City, Brimfield, Kendallville, Avilla and LaOtto.

About
East Noble High School has its origins from the school consolidations that occurred in Indiana in the 1950s and 1960s, due to an act of the Indiana General Assembly.  At that time, the high schools in Rome City, Avilla, and Kendallville were made into junior high/middle schools. In 1966, construction of East Noble High School was completed and the first class entered East Noble (also known as EN) that fall. East Noble's first graduating class was in 1967.

Notable alumni
David M. McIntosh - member of the U.S. House of Representatives for Indiana's 2nd congressional district
Amy Yoder Begley (1996) - Middle and long distance runner. US Olympian in the 10,000 meter event at the 2008 Summer Olympics
Ben Van Ryn - MLB pitcher
 Harold Urey - attended Kendallville High School prior to consolidation; recipient of 1934 Nobel Prize in Chemistry

See also
 List of high schools in Indiana

References

External links
East Noble School Corporation website
Indiana Department of Education Data on East Noble High School

Public high schools in Indiana
Educational institutions established in 1966
Schools in Noble County, Indiana
1966 establishments in Indiana